This a list of the published works of English philosopher Roger Scruton.

Books

Non-fiction
 Art and Imagination (1974)
 The Aesthetics of Architecture (1979)
 The Meaning of Conservatism (1980)
 The Politics of Culture and Other Essays (1981)
 From Descartes to Wittgenstein: A Short History of Modern Philosophy (1981)
 A Dictionary of Political Thought (1982)
 The Aesthetic Understanding (1983)
 Kant (1983)
 Untimely Tracts (1985)
 Thinkers of the New Left (1985)
 Sexual Desire: A Moral Philosophy of the Erotic (1986)
 Spinoza (1986)
 A Land Held Hostage: Lebanon and the West (1987)
 The Philosopher on Dover Beach and Other Essays (1989)
 Conservative Texts (1992)
 Modern Philosophy (1994)
 The Classical Vernacular: Architectural Principles in an Age of Nihilism (1995)
 Animal Rights and Wrongs (1996)
 An Intelligent Person's Guide to Philosophy (1996); republished in 2005 as Philosophy: Principles and Problems
 The Aesthetics of Music (1997)
 An Intelligent Person's Guide to Modern Culture (1998)
 On Hunting (1998)
 Spinoza (1998)
 England: An Elegy (2001)
 The West and the Rest: Globalisation and the Terrorist Threat (2002)
 Death-Devoted Heart: Sex and the Sacred in Wagner's Tristan und Isolde (Oxford University Press, 2004)
 News from Somewhere: On Settling (2004)
 The Need for Nations (2004)
 Gentle Regrets: Thoughts from a Life (Continuum, 2005)
 Animal Rights and Wrongs (2006)
 A Political Philosophy: Arguments for Conservatism (2006)
 Immigration, Multiculturalism and the Need to Defend the Nation State (2006)
 Culture Counts: Faith and Feeling in a World Besieged (Encounter Books, 2007)
 Dictionary of Political Thought (2007)
 Beauty (2009)
 I Drink Therefore I Am: A Philosopher's Guide to Wine (2009)
 Understanding Music (2009)
 The Uses of Pessimism: And the Danger of False Hope (2010)
 Green Philosophy (2011)
The Roger Scruton Reader (2011)
 How to Think Seriously About the Planet: The Case for an Environmental Conservatism (2012)
 The Face of God: The Gifford Lectures (2012)
 Our Church: A Personal History of the Church of England (2012)
 The Soul of the World (2014)
 How to Be a Conservative (2014)
 Fools, Frauds and Firebrands: Thinkers of the New Left (2015)
 The Ring of Truth: The Wisdom of Wagner's Ring of the Nibelung (2016) 
 Conversations with Roger Scruton (2016)
 Confessions of a Heretic: Selected Essays (2016)
 On Human Nature (2017)
 Conservatism: Ideas in Profile (2017)
 The State of Britain Now (2017)
 Conservatism: An Invitation to the Great Tradition (2018)
 Music as an Art (2018)
 Wagner's Parsifal: The Music of Redemption (2020)

Fiction 
 Fortnight's Anger: a novel (1981)
 Francesca: a novel (1991)
 A Dove Descending and Other Stories (1991)
 Xanthippic Dialogues (1993)
 Perictione in Colophon (2000)
 Notes from Underground (2014)
 The Disappeared (2015)
 Souls in the Twilight (2018)

Articles

Opera
 The Minister (1994)
 Violet (2005)

Television
 Why Beauty Matters (BBC 2009).

External links
The Roger Scruton Bibliography, compiled by Christopher Morrissey, Associate Professor of Latin and Philosophy at Redeemer Pacific College, Canada.

Bibliographies of British writers
Bibliographies by writer
Philosophy bibliographies